Olivier Vandevoorde (born 7 August 1969) is a retired French football striker.

References

1969 births
Living people
French footballers
USL Dunkerque players
AS Beauvais Oise players
FC Martigues players
Stade Lavallois players
Angers SCO players
Calais RUFC players
Association football forwards
Ligue 1 players
Ligue 2 players